Gorsedd Stones are groups of standing stones constructed for the National Eisteddfod of Wales. They form an integral part of the druidic Gorsedd ceremonies of the Eisteddfod. The stones can be found as commemorative structures throughout Wales and are the hallmark of the National Eisteddfod having visited a community.

Each stone structure is arranged in a circular formation typically consisting of twelve stone pillars, sometimes from the local area and sometimes, the stones have been brought in to represent the Welsh counties, such as at Aberystwyth. A large, flat-topped stone, known as the Logan Stone, lies at the centre of the circle and serves as a platform.

Origins
An early Gorsedd was held by Iolo Morganwg at a location known as the "Rocking Stone" (in Welsh, "Y Maen Chwŷf") at Pentrebach, Pontypridd; Iolo, a stonemason by trade, constructed a stone circle around the central stone. Iolo had already held a similar ceremony in 1792 in London, also featuring a stone circle. It has been suggested that the "Gorse Stone", located on Stanton Moor in Derbyshire, has some connection with similar Druidic rituals of prehistoric times.

As well as commemorating the National Eisteddfod, the Gorsedd Stones continue to provide an important ceremonial venue for the proclamation of future National Eisteddfodau which according to tradition must be completed one year and one day prior to its official opening. The ceremony is conducted by the Archdruid of the Gorsedd of Bards who formally announces the particulars of the proposed venue.
During the proceedings the Archdruid stands upon the Logan Stone, facing him, to the east cardinal point, is the Stone of the Covenant where the Herald Bard stands, and behind this are the Portal Stones that are guarded by Eisteddfod officials. The portal stone to the right of the entrance points to midsummer sunrise, while that to the left indicates the midwinter sunrise.

References

External links

 National Eisteddfod Festival website in Welsh and English
 Cardiff Gorsedd Stones Some Pictures
 About Modern Stone Circles

Stone monuments and memorials
Druidry
Eisteddfod